Succinea archeyi is a species of small, air-breathing land snail, a terrestrial pulmonate gastropod mollusc in the family Succineidae, the amber snails.

References

Succineidae
Gastropods of New Zealand
Gastropods described in 1933
Taxa named by Arthur William Baden Powell
Endemic fauna of New Zealand
Endemic molluscs of New Zealand